In team sports, a most valuable player award, abbreviated 'MVP award', is an honor typically bestowed upon an individual (or individuals, in the instance of a tie) whose individual performance is the greatest in an entire league, for a particular competition, or on a specific team. The purpose of the award is recognize the contribution of the individual's efforts amongst a group effort, and to highlight the excellence, exemplariness, and/or outstandingness of a player's performance amidst the performance of their peers in question.

The term can have different connotations depending on the context in which it is used. A 'League MVP' is the most valuable player in an entire league, and refers to the player whose performance is most excellent in the league. Similarly, a "Team MVP" is the most valuable player on a team, referring to the player whose team contribution is greatest amongst their teammates. In many sports, MVP awards are presented for a specific match—in other words, a player of the match award. This is particularly true for high profile matches like championship games. For example, during a finals championship series, a 'Finals MVP' award would be bestowed upon the most valuable player in the finals game(s).

Ice hockey player, Wayne Gretzky, has been named MVP more times than any player in the history of the other three North American major professional leagues (MLB, NBA, and NFL). He won the award a record nine times during his career, eight consecutively. Barry Bonds is second, having won the MVP award seven times in the National League of Major League Baseball (The American League also awards an MVP), although until the 1930s baseball players were only permitted to win the award one time which limited the number of times Babe Ruth could win. Kareem Abdul-Jabbar won the NBA MVP award six times, and Michael Jordan won the award five times. Peyton Manning won the NFL MVP five times. Only five players have won as many as three: Jim Brown, Johnny Unitas, Brett Favre, Tom Brady, Aaron Rodgers.

An important distinction is that the MVP is not be conflated with the most winningest player. Although the two are usually somewhat correlated, there are several (albeit rare) prime counterexamples. For instance, in professional basketball, Kareem-Abdul Jabbar won the 1975-76 MVP award even though his team did not qualify for the postseason. Additionally, several other NBA players in history have been awarded MVP, and proceeded to lose in the first round of the postseason. In another instance in professional basketball, Jerry West was awarded the 1969 NBA Finals MVP Award, despite having lost the finals. In the sport of professional football, Johnny Unitas won the 1967 MVP award, despite not qualifying for the playoffs. Likewise, O.J. Simpson won the 1973 MVP award, despite not qualifying for the playoffs. Similar to Jerry West in basketball, Chuck Howley in football won the 1971 Super Bowl Most Valuable Player Award despite having lost the Super Bowl V. In 1960, Bobby Richardson won the World Series MVP Award, but lost the World Series. In ice hockey, three players, Al Rollins in 1954, Andy Bathgate in 1959 and Mario Lemieux in 1988 each won an NHL MVP award, but did not make the playoffs. Also, Reggie Leach won the 1976 NHL Finals MVP award while breaking the league record for most playoff goals, but lost the finals. In baseball history, several MVPs have not made the playoffs, and in 2021, all six MLB MVP finalists did not make the playoffs.

The term is most common in the United States and Canada. In most other countries around the world, "player of the year" is used for a season-spanning award and "player of the match" for individual games. In Australia, Australian rules football clubs and leagues use the term "best and fairest", while those playing rugby league use "player of the year", such as the Dally M Medal.

History

The first most valuable player award given in North American sports can be traced back to professional baseball in the early 1900s. A group of sportswriters met after the 1911 baseball season to determine the “most important and useful players to the club and to the league”. These athletes would receive The Chalmers Award, named for Hugh Chalmers, a car manufacturer seeking to increase sales of his Chalmers Model 30 automobiles. The first recipients were Ty Cobb, playing for the Detroit Tigers, and Frank Schulte of the Chicago Cubs. The award was discontinued in 1914, after it failed to result in higher car sales.  From 1922 to 1928 in the American League and from 1924 to 1929 in the National League, an MVP award was given to "the baseball player who is of the greatest all-around service to his club". Prior winners were not eligible to win the MVP award again during this time. The MVP award, as it is known today in Major League Baseball, was first established in 1931.

Selection Process

Generally, MVP awards are given at the conclusion of a multi-step process. In most professional sports leagues, the overall pool of players is initially narrowed down to a list of nominees, called finalists, forming a group from which the individual winner is decided based on regular season performance. This process is typically performing by way of a vote, wherein voters are usually either other players, members of the media and/or coaches. The specifics of this process varies across leagues. Some prominent examples of sports that conduct MVP awards are baseball, basketball, football, ice hockey, lacrosse, soccer, handball and rugby.

Baseball

In MLB, MVP voting takes place before the postseason, but the results are not announced until after the World Series. The BBWAA began by polling three writers in each league city in 1938, reducing that number to two per league city in 1961. The BBWAA does not offer a clear-cut definition of what "most valuable" means, instead leaving the judgment to the individual voters.

Basketball

In the NBA, the protocol for selecting the MVP has shifted throughout the year. Through the 1979-80 season, the basketball players themselves comprised the MVP voting bloc up. Since the start of the 1980 NBA season, a panel of broadcasters and sportswriters are brought together to vote on the MVP award. Every person on the panel casts a vote for their first-place selection all the way to their fifth. A first-place vote nets a player 10 points while a second is worth seven, a third worth five, a fourth worth three, and a fifth worth one. At the end of the voting, the player with the most overall points wins the award.

American Football

In the NFL, the MVP award is voted upon by a panel of 50 sportswriters at the end of the regular season, before the playoffs, though the results are not announced to the public until the day before the Super Bowl. The sportswriters chosen regularly follow the NFL, and remain mostly consistent from year to year. They are chosen based on expertise and are independent of the league itself.

Ice Hockey

In the NHL, the MVP award voting is conducted at the end of the regular season by members of the Professional Hockey Writers' Association, and each individual voter ranks their top five candidates on a 10-7-5-3-1 point(s) system. Three finalists are named and the trophy is awarded at the NHL Awards ceremony after the playoffs.

Field Lacrosse

In the PLL, the MVP award (and all other awards) are selected by a two-round voting process. In first round voting, players and coaches will vote to determine nominees for each award. In second round voting, Media, PLL Front Office, and PLL Lacrosse Advisory Board vote on nominees to determine winners. Award winners are announced during the Awards Ceremony at the end of the season.

Box Lacrosse

In the NLL, the MVP award (and all other awards) nominees are voted on by select media. Each ballot allowed the voting members to rank their top five choices for the award. Each individual voter ranks their top five candidates on a 10-7-5-3-1 point(s) system (similar to the NHL system). The top three vote accumulating individuals will be announced as the finalists for the award. The finalist who accumulated the most points after the voting period ended will be the award winner. In the case of a tie, the tiebreaker is to be decided by the individual who received the most 1st Place votes, followed by the number of 2nd place votes, and so on, until a winner is decided.

Association Football
MVP is more commonly referred to in Association Football as “Player of the Season”. In the FIFA World Cup, the award is called the (Golden Ball) and is chosen by the FIFA technical committee (Technical Study Group)and the winner voted for by representatives of the media.

In the Premier League, (Player of the Season) is chosen by a panel assembled by the league's sponsors consisting of members of "football's governing bodies, the media and fans", and is announced in the second or third week of May.

In Philosophy of Sport

The concept of the 'most valuable player' is discussed within the field of philosophy of sport. Philosophers Stephen Kershnar and Neil Feit argue that the concept of the MVP is a fundamentally vague concept, but yet valuable in that it promotes the active discussion of different types of excellence found within a specific sport and the weight to be assigned these types, thus leading to a gain for the discussants. Stephen Kershnar termed this vagueness the 'Most Valuable Player Problem'. He offered a solution to the problem, but later recanted it conceding that the problem remains unsolved.

Examples
 Major League Baseball's American and National Leagues,  AL & NL Championship Series, and World Series; also All-Star Game
 National Football League regular season and Super Bowl; also Pro Bowl
 Hart Memorial Trophy and Lester B. Pearson/Ted Lindsay Award (National Hockey League regular season) and Conn Smythe Trophy (playoffs); the All-Star Game also has an MVP
 National Basketball Association regular season and Finals; also NBA All-Star Game
 Woman National Basketball Association regular season and Finals
 EuroLeague MVP
 Major League Soccer regular season and MLS Cup; also MLS All-Star Game
 FIVB Tournaments
 Canadian Football League regular season, East Division, West Division, and Grey Cup; also "Most Valuable Canadian" awards for the regular season and Grey Cup
 College football's Heisman Trophy
 NCAA basketball tournament; there are also various awards for the player(s) selected as player of the year
 Indian Premier League
 National Basketball League regular season and Grand Final
 Leigh Matthews Trophy, given by the AFL Players Association to the AFL's most valuable player (as opposed to the Brownlow Medal, given to the fairest and best)
 Philippine Basketball Association regular season, PBA Finals; also PBA All-Star Game
 European League of Football both for their regular season and their Championship Game

See also
 Athlete of the Year
 Most Outstanding Player (disambiguation)

References

 
Sports trophies and awards
Terminology used in multiple sports